Westphaliasaurus is an extinct genus of plesiosaur from Lower Jurassic (Pliensbachian stage) deposits of Westphalia, northwestern Germany. It is known from a nearly complete and articulated skeleton missing the skull and about 38% of the upper neck vertebrae. It was found by Sönke Simonsen, an amateur paleontologist, in 2007 from the Höxter district near Bielefeld, in the east of North Rhine-Westphalia, Germany. It was first named by Leonie Schwermann and Martin Sander in 2011 and the type species is Westphaliasaurus simonsensii. The generic name is derived from the latinized name for Westfalen, Westphalia and lizard, saurus. The specific name honors Sönke Simonsen.

See also

 List of plesiosaur genera
 Timeline of plesiosaur research

References

Early Jurassic plesiosaurs of Europe
Fossil taxa described in 2011
Plesiosauroids
Sauropterygian genera